Mona Mahmudnizhad (September 10, 1965 – June 18, 1983) was an Iranian Baháʼí who, in 1983, together with nine other Baháʼí women, was sentenced to death and hanged in Shiraz, Iran on the grounds of being a member of the Baháʼí Faith. The official charges ranged from "misleading children and youth" to being a "Zionist", as the Baháʼí World Centre is located in Israel.

The nonprofit Mona Foundation focusing on girls' education was named after her in 2001.

Childhood
Mahmudnizhad was born on September 10, 1965, to Yad'u'llah and Farkhundeh Mahmudnizhad, who had left their home in Iran to teach their religion in Yemen.

In 1969, the government of Yemen expelled all foreigners and the Mahmudnizhad family returned to Iran. They spent two years in Isfahan, six months in Kermanshah and three years in Tabriz before finally settling in Shiraz in 1974. During this time, her father worked repairing small appliances and served the Baháʼí community in various Baháʼí administrative bodies.

Arrest, sentencing and death
While Baháʼís regularly faced persecution in Iran, it increased following the Islamic Revolution of 1979. At 7:30pm on October 23, 1982, four armed Revolutionary Guards, on the orders of the public prosecutor of Shiraz, entered the Mahmudnizhad household and ransacked it in search of Baháʼí material. They then took Mona and her father into custody. They were blindfolded and taken to Seppah prison in Shiraz, where they were placed in separate quarters; Mahmudnizhad was detained there for 38 days. On November 29, 1982, she and five other Baháʼí women were transferred from Seppah prison to Adelabad prison, also in Shiraz.

After some time, she was taken to the Islamic Revolutionary Court where she was interrogated and then returned to prison. A few days later, she was again interrogated in front of an Islamic Revolutionary judge. After these interrogations, which involved physical torture by being whipped on the soles of her feet with a cable, Mahmudnizhad was found guilty and sentenced to death by hanging.

President of the United States Ronald Reagan called for clemency; despite this, the sentence of the 10 women was carried out on the night of June 18, 1983, at a nearby polo field.

The other women who were hanged with Mahmudnizhad were:
 Nusrat Yalda'i, 54 years old.
 'Izzat Janami Ishraqi, 50 years old.
 Roya Ishraqi, 23 and daughter of 'Izzat.
 Tahirih Siyavushi, 32 years old.
 Zarrin Muqimi, 28 years old.
 Shirin Dalvand, 25 years old.
 Akhtar Sabit, 19 or early 20s.
Simin Saberi, 24 years old.
 Mahshid Nirumand, 28 years old.

In September 2007, the Iran Human Rights Documentation Center published a case study on the subject.

Depictions
Mahmudnizhad's story is the subject of several art works. Music artist Doug Cameron recreated Mahmudnizhad's story in a music video, Mona with the Children, which made the pop charts in Canada (#14 for the week of October 19, 1985).  The video was distributed throughout the music scene and was effective in bringing the persecution of Baháʼís in Iran to international public attention.

A play based on Mahmudnizhad's story titled A Dress for Mona has been produced and in 2008 Jack Lenz planned to produce a film called Mona's Dream. Her pictures are also featured in Mithaq Kazimi's Quenching The Light video.

See also
 Persecution of Baháʼís
 Human rights in Iran
 Táhirih

Notes

External links
 Website for A Dress for Mona, a play about Mona Mahmudnizhad
 Background information and lyrics for Mona with the Children, a song about Mona Mahmudnizhad

Iranian Bahá'ís
People executed for refusing to convert to Islam
People executed by Iran by hanging
Executed Iranian women
Executed Iranian people
Bahá'í martyrs
1965 births
1983 deaths
20th-century Bahá'ís